Olcsva is a village in Szabolcs-Szatmár-Bereg county, in the Northern Great Plain region of eastern Hungary.

Jews lived in Olcsva for many years until they were murdered in the Holocaust. Apparently there was a Jewish cemetery in the village.

Geography

References

Olcsva
Jewish communities destroyed in the Holocaust